The Naksansa bronze bell was a temple bronze bell of Naksansa. It was made by Yejong of Joseon in 1469. It was designated as a national treasure of Korea.

In the 5 April 2005 forest fire, the bell melted and destroyed. The remains of the bell were kept at the Korean National Research Institute of Cultural Heritage.

The Cultural Heritage Administration withdrew it as a national treasure due to its destruction.

In 2006, a replica of the bell was created and reinstalled in Naksansa.

References

External links 
 Official site, in Korean

Bells (percussion)